Countries and territories in Oceania have the following emblems and national coats of arms:

Sovereign states

Dependencies and other territories

See also

 Flags of Oceania
 Armorial of sovereign states
 Armorial of Africa
 Armorial of North America
 Armorial of South America
 Armorial of Asia
 Armorial of Europe

External links

Oceania
Oceania-related lists
 
Oceania
Oceania